An automatic grenade launcher (AGL) or grenade machine gun is a grenade launcher that is capable of fully automatic fire, and is typically loaded with either an ammunition belt or magazine.

These weapons are often mounted on vehicles or helicopters, as when these weapons are moved by infantry the weapon, its tripod, and ammunition, are a heavy load, requiring a small team. Other types of grenade launchers are typically much lighter and can easily be carried by just a single soldier.
The Mark 19 Automatic Grenade Launcher, first fielded by the United States in 1966, and still widely used today, weighs 62.5 kg (137.58 lb) when attached to its tripod, and loaded with a box of ammunition.
For comparison, the single-shot M79 grenade launcher weighs 2.93 kg (6.45 lb). Regardless of their weight, AGLs are still highly effective, and the Mark 19 is capable of indirect fire up to 2,200 metres, a role traditionally reserved for mortars. Even though the round carries less explosive than a 60mm mortar shell, this is thought to be counterbalanced by its much higher volume of fire.

The most popular caliber for automatic grenade launchers in Western nations has been 40mm.  The Soviet Union successfully fielded a 30mm grenade launcher, the AGS-17, during its war in Afghanistan. In 2002, Russia introduced a successor weapon, the AGS-30, and in 2017, the AGS-40 Balkan.  Traditional munitions for automatic grenade launchers include high explosive, fragmentation, and shaped charge for attacking light armored vehicles. Less lethal rounds, like tear gas and sponge grenades for crowd control, have also been made. In the 21st century, AGLs have been made with integrated sight/range systems which can set a fused round to detonate precisely on, above, or behind a designated target.  

Different weapons use different methods of operation, with blowback and long recoil being two common choices. In all these weapons, the energy released by firing a round loads the next round into the weapon's breech. The Mark 19 is automatically reloaded through the blowback method, where expanding gases blow back the firing bolt. 

In the long recoil method the bolt is fixed to the firing chamber, and the whole firing chamber is blown back. These weapons are slightly less accurate, but weigh less than blowback weapons.
General Dynamics manufactures a long recoil weapon, the Mark 47 Automatic Grenade Launcher, as does the Spanish firm Santa Bárbara. The LAG-40 manufactured by Santa Bárbara has a relatively low rate of fire of 215 rounds per minute.

Comparison

Ammunition

See also
List of grenade launchers

References

 
Machine guns
Automatic grenade launchers